DavidsTea (often stylized as DAVIDsTEA) (in French Les Thés DavidsTea) is a Canadian specialty tea and tea accessory retailer based in Montreal, Quebec. It is the largest Canadian-based specialty tea boutique in the country. Following the company's initial public offering, common stock began trading on the NASDAQ Global Market on June 5, 2015.

The company had 240 locations but by July 2020 required financial reorganization, which involved permanently closing all 42 U.S. stores, 166 stores in Canada, and focusing on its e-commerce and wholesale business.

History 

In 2008, David Segal and his cousin Herschel Segal founded DavidsTea's headquarters and main offices in Montreal, but opened its first store on Queen Street in Toronto the same year, followed by its first Montreal store, in 2009. In 2010, the company had stores located across Canada, opening its 50th store in Waterloo, Ontario in 2011 and, that November, opened its first store outside of Canada, in New York City. A growing boutique tea industry expanded the company, by 2012, to more than 75 stores across North America, with over 150 varieties of tea.

The company conducted an initial public offering in the United States in June 2015, the proposed NASDAQ stock symbol being DTEA.

In 2013, former talkshow host Oprah Winfrey surprised the small company by promoting the brand in live shows, and later in O, The Oprah Magazine.

In March 2016, co-founder David Segal resigned from DavidsTea.

On May 24, 2016, Christine Bullen was appointed managing director of U.S. markets. On December 8, 2016, Bullen was named interim president and CEO, effective February 1, 2017.

On March 13, 2017, DavidsTea appointed Joel Silver as president and chief executive officer. On June 14, 2018, Silver resigned as chief executive after the company's shareholders voted to elect a new group of directors to the company's board, including Herschel Segal, one of the company's original founders.

In August 2018, DavidsTea announced plans to sell tea bags of their best-selling blends at Loblaw locations across Canada.

In June 2020, DavidsTea announced that it has not paid rent at any of its store locations for three months as all its stores have been closed since March 17 due to the COVID-19 pandemic. It also indicated that it may pursue a formal restructuring. The company announced on July 8 that it was filing for bankruptcy protection from its creditors in Canada to continue operations while it restructured, and planned to close down a significant number of stores. By that date, the company had obtained Chapter 15, Title 11, United States Code court protection from creditors in the US. The next day, it was announced that 82 locations in Canada and all 42 locations in the United States would close, while more favourable leases were sought for the remaining 100 stores, with more to potentially close depending on the outcome of these talks with landlords. By September, they had reduced the number of retail locations to 18. Of 240 locations it had at the start of 2020, it permanently closed all 42 U.S. stores and 166 stores in Canada. It announced that it would focus on its e-commerce and wholesale businesses.

References

External links

 

Companies based in Quebec
Mount Royal, Quebec
Tea companies of Canada
Retail companies established in 2008
2008 establishments in Quebec
Companies listed on the Nasdaq
Companies that filed for Chapter 11 bankruptcy in 2020
Companies that have filed for bankruptcy in Canada